Private or privates may refer to:

Music
 "In Private", by Dusty Springfield from the 1990 album Reputation
 Private (band), a Denmark-based band
 "Private" (Ryōko Hirosue song), from the 1999 album Private, written and also recorded by Ringo Sheena
 "Private" (Vera Blue song), from the 2017 album Perennial

Literature
 Private (novel), 2010 novel by James Patterson
 Private (novel series), young-adult book series launched in 2006

Film and television
 Private (film), 2004 Italian film 
 Private (web series), 2009 web series based on the novel series
 Privates (TV series), 2013 BBC One TV series
 Private, a penguin character in Madagascar

Other uses
 Private (rank), a military rank
 Privates (video game), 2010 video game
 Private (rocket), American multistage rocket
 Private Media Group, Swedish adult entertainment production and distribution company
 Private (magazine), flagship magazine of the Private Media Group
 Privates, or Intimate parts, a euphemism for human genitals

See also
 Privacy (disambiguation)
 Private methods, a means of encapsulation in object-oriented programming
 Private school
 Private university
 Privately held company
 Private sector
 Privatization